Celotex Corporation is a defunct American manufacturer of insulation and construction materials. It was the subject of a number of high-profile lawsuits over products containing asbestos in the 1980s, eventually declaring Chapter 11 bankruptcy in 1990.

The company was founded in 1920 in Chicago, Illinois as a subsidiary of Philip Carey Corporation, to manufacture its namesake product Celotex insulation board, often called simply Celotex. Celotex is a fiberboard made from bagasse (sugar cane waste after extraction of the juice), first produced in a factory in Marrero, Louisiana, outside of New Orleans. In 1932, Celotex Corporation was spun off as an independent company. In 1961, Jim Walter Corporation, a homebuilding company, acquired Celotex, moving the headquarters to Tampa, Florida in 1965. Celotex moved again, to Saint Petersburg, Florida, in 2001.

Celotex Asbestos Settlement Trust
Celotex emerged from Chapter 11 in 1996. A $1.2 billion settlement trust was established in 1998 to settle claims arising from asbestos-containing products manufactured by both Celotex and Philip Carey. The wallboard business was sold to BPB plc, its roofing products business to CertainTeed in 2000, its fiberboard products division along with the Celotex brand to Knight Industries LLC in 2001, and its rigid foam insulation division to the Dow Chemical Company in 2001.

In 2012, Saint-Gobain acquired the British manufacturing interests of Celotex. In 2017, a disastrous fire at the Grenfell Tower, London was blamed on exterior cladding manufactured by Celotex-Saint-Gobain.

The future of Celotex
The brand name Celotex is currently owned by Saint-Gobain, which manufactures products under the Celotex brand. This includes products such as insulation boards and insulated plasterboards.

See also
 Celotex Corp. v. Catrett
 Cemesto
 Homasote

References

External links
 Brochure: "Celotex Insulating Lumber" (1923)

1920 establishments in Illinois
Building materials companies
Manufacturing companies based in Chicago
Defunct manufacturing companies of the United States